Peter Michael Muhich (born May 13, 1961) is an American prelate of the Roman Catholic Church who has been serving as bishop of the Diocese of Rapid City in South Dakota since 2020.

Biography

Early years 
Peter Muhich was born on May 13, 1961, to Donald and Mary Muhich in Eveleth, Minnesota, the second of seven children. He attended Eveleth Public High School. After his graduation in 1979, Muhich attended [Saint John Vianney College Seminary in St. Paul, Minnesota. In 1983, Muhich went to Louvain, Belgium to attend the American College of the Immaculate Conception, where he completed his theological studies in 1989.

Priesthood 
On September 29, 1989, Muhich was ordained to the priesthood by Bishop Robert Henry Brom for the Diocese of Duluth. He served there in various pastoral roles for three decades.

Bishop of Rapid City 
On May 12, 2020, Pope Francis appointed Muhich as bishop for the Diocese of Rapid City. He was consecrated by Archbishop Bernard Hebda on July 9, 2020.

See also

 Catholic Church hierarchy
 Catholic Church in the United States
 Historical list of the Catholic bishops of the United States
 List of Catholic bishops of the United States
 Lists of patriarchs, archbishops, and bishops

References

External links
Roman Catholic Diocese of Rapid City Official Site 
Roman Catholic Diocese of Duluth Official Site

Episcopal succession

 
 

1961 births
Living people
People from Eveleth, Minnesota
21st-century Roman Catholic bishops in the United States
Bishops appointed by Pope Francis